Pornography in Germany is legal with the exception of violent, animal or child pornography. Like in many other countries, child pornography in Germany is illegal. German prosecution authorities and legal bodies of Germany's 16 states handle the definition of child pornography very differently. The German Edathy affair of 2013/14 following the neglected cooperation of BKA within the Canadian child pornography uncoverings gave way for new legislation procedures in parliament to define the status of either posing or exhibitive pictures of minors. New laws were still in parliamentary debating as lately as 19 December 2014.

Modern German pornography is generally similar to the American "glamour" pornography though often tailored primarily for the German market. In contrast, several German labels focus on a more "home-made" amateur flair, often focusing on intense hardcore themes such as gang bangs, bukkake and urine fetishism; most notably 'German Goo Girls' and other series by John Thompson Productions.

MindGeek's age-verification software AgeID, which is used to verify the ages of users of pornographic Internet websites, has been in use in Germany since 2015.

History
The world's first sex shop was opened in Flensburg in 1962 by Beate Uhse AG. Post-WW2 commercial movie pornography German began with the softcore film Graf Porno und seine Mädchen (Count Porno and his girls) in 1968. The movie's success (more than 3 million admissions) lead to a whole series of films that was and is referred to in German media as the Sex-Welle (sex wave). The most well known film of this period is Schulmädchen-Report: Was Eltern nicht für möglich halten (The School-Girl Report, what the parents don't believe possible) by Ernst Hofbauer in 1970. The sex scenes had become bolder with time and by 1975, when the legal ban of pornography was lifted, the era of German hardcore pornography began.

Film and pornography
Director Hans Billian was the protagonist of the period and the films were usually in line with the so-called "Bavarian porn sex comedies", often depicting male performers as comic characters, like Sepp Gneißl in Kasimir der Kuckuckskleber (1977). This era was also characterised by several Josephine Mutzenbacher films.

References

German pornography